Filip Mirkulovski (born 14 September 1983) is a retired Macedonian handball player.

Honours

 Macedonian Handball Super League 
Winners  (6): 2005-06, 2007-08, 2009-10, 2010-11, 2011-12 and 2013-14

 Macedonian Handball Cup 
Winners   (5): 2006, 2009, 2010, 2011 2013

External links 
 

1983 births
Living people
Macedonian male handball players
HSG Wetzlar players
Sportspeople from Skopje
Macedonian expatriate sportspeople in Germany
Expatriate handball players
Handball-Bundesliga players